Charles F. McMillan is an American nuclear physicist and served as the 10th director of the Los Alamos National Laboratory. His appointment was effective June 1, 2011. He succeeded Michael R. Anastasio. On September 5, 2017, McMillan announced he would be leaving the director position at the end of the year.

Biography
Charles F. McMillan had been Principal Associate Director for Weapons Programs at Los Alamos and joined the laboratory in 2006, where he was responsible for directing the science, technology, engineering, and infrastructure that enables the Laboratory to deliver on its core mission of ensuring the safety, reliability, and performance of the nation's nuclear deterrent. McMillan was elected by peers to lead the Nuclear Security Enterprise Integration Council.
Established in 1943 as part of the Manhattan Project, Los Alamos National Laboratory is a principal contributor to NNSAs' programs to maintain the U.S. nuclear weapons stockpile and to reduce the international dangers posed by weapons of mass destruction.

McMillan is also president of Los Alamos National Security, LLC, the company that manages and operates the lab for the National Nuclear Security Administration.

Prior to joining Los Alamos, McMillan, an experimental physicist, spent more than 20 years at Lawrence Livermore National Laboratory in California, beginning in 1983. He holds a doctorate in physics from the Massachusetts Institute of Technology and a bachelor of science in Mathematics and Physics from Washington Adventist University.

His annual compensation as director of the laboratory, including benefits and pension value increase, was reported as US $1,081,059 a year in 2011.

Personal
McMillan has been awarded two Department of Energy Awards of Excellence. He is married with three children. He is also an avid photographer and accomplished musician, playing piano, organ, and recorder. McMillan continues to perform in a baroque chamber music ensemble.

Quotes
"I have great optimism for the future," said McMillan. "This is a complicated time but also a time of great opportunity for the program, an opportunity to work with the Administration to shape tomorrow’s nuclear security complex while effectively managing the nuclear stockpile along the way. The service we provide to the nation is as important now as it ever was."

Summing up his philosophy on how science is best managed, McMillan quoted from the collection of Lewis Thomas essays, Lives of a Cell: "What [research] needs is for the air to be made right. If you want a bee to make honey, you do not issue protocols on solar navigation or carbohydrate chemistry, you put him together with other bees . . . and you do what you can to arrange the general environment around the hive. If the air is right, the science will come in its own season, like pure honey."

Events
Dr. Charles F. McMillan presented a lecture on: "The Timeline of Technology", offering examples of how innovations in the 20th century are used in this century to solve national and global security, energy and environmental issues, on October 1, 2014, at Howard H. Baker, Jr. Center for Public Policy. He stressed the importance of Los Alamos to national security, and reflected on the last Divider nuclear test, on September 23, 1992, in Operation Julin.

References

Sources
 Testimony of Dr. Charles F. McMillan, Laboratory Director 
Los Alamos National Laboratory 
Before the Senate Committee on Armed Services Subcommittee on Strategic Forces 
April 18, 2012 .
https://web.archive.org/web/20121017070433/http://www.armed-services.senate.gov/statemnt/2012/04%20April/McMillan%2004-18-12.pdf

Los Alamos Neutron Science Center (LANSCE) 
http://www.lanl.gov/science/NSS/issue1_2012/story1.shtml

Dr. McMillan's presentation at UC Berkeley on Thursday, Sept. 13-2012.
https://web.archive.org/web/20130530142142/http://nssc.berkeley.edu/32-featured-scientist/151-lanl-director-dr-charles-mcmillan-visits-uc-berkeley-and-meets-with-students.html

Dr. Charles F. McMillan lecture, "The Timeline of Technology" at Howard H. Baker, Jr. Center for Public Policy, on Wednesday, October 1-2014, 5:30 pm —  fall semester Global Security Distinguished Lecture featuring Dr. Charles McMillan, Director, Los Alamos Laboratory in the Toyota Auditorium. http://bakercenter.utk.edu/global-security-distinguished-lecture-featuring-charles-mcmillan-wed-oct-1-530-pm-toyota-auditorium/, https://web.archive.org/web/20151008174713/https://sf.ites.utk.edu/utk/Play/a0f32d187c724aeb8edd2c5c4ea09d671d

Living people
American nuclear physicists
Los Alamos National Laboratory personnel
MIT Department of Physics alumni
21st-century American physicists
Lawrence Livermore National Laboratory staff
Year of birth missing (living people)